Opioid growth factor receptor, also known as OGFr or the ζ-opioid receptor, is a protein which in humans is encoded by the OGFR gene. The protein encoded by this gene is a receptor for opioid growth factor (OGF), also known as [Met(5)]-enkephalin. The endogenous ligand is thus a known opioid peptide, and OGFr was originally discovered and named as a new opioid receptor zeta (ζ). However it was subsequently found that it shares little sequence similarity with the other opioid receptors, and has quite different function.

Function 
The natural function of this receptor appears to be in regulation of tissue growth, and it has been shown to be important in embryonic development, wound repair, and certain forms of cancer.

OGF is a negative regulator of cell proliferation and tissue organization in a variety of processes. The encoded unbound receptor for OGF has been localized to the outer nuclear envelope, where it binds OGF and is translocated into the nucleus. The coding sequence of this gene contains a polymorphic region of 60 nt tandem imperfect repeat units. Several transcripts containing between zero and eight repeat units have been reported.

Mechanism of activation 
The opioid growth factor receptor consists of a chain of 677 amino acids, which includes a nuclear localization sequence region. When OGF binds to the receptor, an OGF-OGFr complex is formed, which leads to the increase in the synthesis of the selective cyclin-dependent kinase (CDK) inhibitor proteins, p12 and p16. Retinoblastoma protein becomes inactivated through phosphorylation by CDKs, and leads to the progression of the cell cycle from the G1 phase to the S phase. Because the activation of the OGF receptor, blocks the phosphorylation of retinoblastoma proteins, retardation of the G1 phase occurs, which prevents the cell from further dividing.

Therapeutic applications 
Upregulation of OGFr and consequent stimulation of the OGF-OGFr system are important for the anti-proliferative effects of  imidazoquinoline drugs like imiquimod and resiquimod, which are immune response modifiers with potent antiviral and antitumour effects, used as topical creams for the treatment of skin cancers and warts.

Structure 

OGF contains a conserved N-terminal domain followed by a series of imperfect repeats.

References

Further reading

Protein families